"Crocodile Rock" is a song written by Elton John and Bernie Taupin, and recorded in summer 1972 at the Château d'Hérouville studio in France (it was listed as "Strawberry Studios" in the album's credits), where John and his team had previously recorded the Honky Château album. It was released on 27 October 1972 in the UK and 20 November 1972 in the U.S., as a pre-release single from his forthcoming 1973 album Don't Shoot Me I'm Only the Piano Player, and became his first U.S. number-one single, reaching the top spot on 3 February 1973, and staying there for three weeks. In the U.S., it was certified Gold on 5 February 1973 and Platinum on 13 September 1995 by the RIAA.

In Canada, it topped the chart as well, remaining at number one on the RPM 100 national singles chart for four weeks from 17 February through 10 March. It was the first song released as a single on the MCA label (catalogue #40000) after MCA dissolved its Uni, Decca, Kapp and Coral labels. (John had previously been with the Uni label.)

"Crocodile Rock" is dominated by a Farfisa organ, played by John. The lyrics take a nostalgic look at early rock 'n' roll, pop culture, dating and youthful independence of that era. John's band members, including Davey Johnstone on guitars, Dee Murray on bass and Nigel Olsson on drums, were also performers on the song. John, however, did all the vocals, including the falsetto backing vocals.

Inspiration
The song was inspired by John's discovery of leading Australian band Daddy Cool and their hit single "Eagle Rock", which was the most successful Australian single of the early 1970s (with 1,000,000 sold), remaining at No.1 for a record of 10 weeks. John heard the song and the group on his 1972 Australian tour and was greatly impressed by it. A photo included in the album packaging features John's lyricist, Bernie Taupin, wearing a "Daddy Who?" promotional badge. The song also includes a lyrical reference to the 1950s hit record "Rock Around the Clock" by Bill Haley and his Comets ("While the other kids were rocking around the clock...").

In a 1974 lawsuit filed in the US District Court of Los Angeles by attorney Donald Barnett on behalf of "Speedy Gonzales"' composer Buddy Kaye, it was alleged that defendants John and Taupin illegally incorporated chords from "Speedy Gonzales" which produced a falsetto tone into the "Crocodile" song co-written by defendants. The parties reached a settlement between them and the case was then dismissed.

Taupin also stated in an Esquire magazine interview that "Crocodile Rock" was a funny song in that he did not mind creating it, but it would not be something he would listen to; it was simply something fun at the time. John has dismissed criticism of the song that it was "derivative", quoted in the booklet for the 1995 reissue of Don't Shoot Me ... as saying, "I wanted it to be a record about all the things I grew up with. Of course it's a rip-off, it's derivative in every sense of the word."

Billboard reviewed the single, stating that it "is a clever easy beat rocker with a sound and flavor of the 50's hits."

Live performances
John has played the song numerous times live in concert from 1972 to 1984, and then again from 1998 to present (excluding the ballad version of this song performed from 1993 to 1994, that he performed at the Greek Theater with Ray Cooper in September 1994). Live versions released include an audio version from 1974 on the Here and There original LP and 1995 CD reissue, and a video concert version on the Elton 60 – Live at Madison Square Garden DVD release.

In 2021, John revealed that "Crocodile Rock" was "written as a kind of joke" and that he does not enjoy playing the song any more. He has continued singing it in concert because fans enjoy it, but has vowed never to play it again once his Farewell Yellow Brick Road tour has ended.

Personnel
 Elton John – piano, Farfisa organ, vocals
 Davey Johnstone – electric guitar
 Dee Murray – bass
 Nigel Olsson – drums

Charts

Weekly charts

Year-end charts

All-time charts

Certifications

See also 
 List of Billboard Hot 100 number-one singles of 1973

References

1972 songs
1972 singles
Billboard Hot 100 number-one singles
Cashbox number-one singles
Elton John songs
The Beach Boys songs
Baha Men songs
RPM Top Singles number-one singles
Number-one singles in New Zealand
Number-one singles in Italy
Number-one singles in Switzerland
Songs with music by Elton John
Songs with lyrics by Bernie Taupin
Song recordings produced by Gus Dudgeon
Songs about rock music
Songs about dancing
Songs about nostalgia
DJM Records singles
MCA Records singles